Soutzouki may refer to:

 sujuk, a kind of sausage
 soutzoukos or soutzouki, a sausage-shaped confection